The Select Stakes is an American Thoroughbred horse race run annually at Monmouth Park Racetrack in Oceanport, New Jersey. First run in 1883, the race is open to three-year-olds and is run over a distance of six furlongs on dirt.

Among the notable winners of the Select are Champions Sheilas Reward in 1950, Decathlon in 1956, Nadir in 1958. Shecky Greene in 1973,  Gallant Bob in 1975  plus in 1979, the Florida-bred Canadian Horse Racing Hall of Fame inductee, Bold Ruckus.

Winners

References

Ungraded stakes races in the United States
Flat horse races for three-year-olds
Recurring sporting events established in 1883
Monmouth Park Racetrack